Godfrey Harold Hardy  (7 February 1877 – 1 December 1947) was an English mathematician, known for his achievements in number theory and mathematical analysis. In biology, he is known for the Hardy–Weinberg principle, a basic principle of population genetics.

G. H. Hardy is usually known by those outside the field of mathematics for his 1940 essay A Mathematician's Apology, often considered one of the best insights into the mind of a working mathematician written for the layperson.

Starting in 1914, Hardy was the mentor of the Indian mathematician Srinivasa Ramanujan, a relationship that has become celebrated. Hardy almost immediately recognised Ramanujan's extraordinary albeit untutored brilliance, and Hardy and Ramanujan became close collaborators. In an interview by Paul Erdős, when Hardy was asked what his greatest contribution to mathematics was, Hardy unhesitatingly replied that it was the discovery of Ramanujan. In a lecture on Ramanujan, Hardy said that "my association with him
is the one romantic incident in my life".

Early life and career
G. H. Hardy was born on 7 February 1877, in Cranleigh, Surrey, England, into a teaching family. His father was Bursar and Art Master at Cranleigh School; his mother had been a senior mistress at Lincoln Training College for teachers. Both of his parents were mathematically inclined, though neither had a university education.

Hardy's own natural affinity for mathematics was perceptible at an early age. When just two years old, he wrote numbers up to millions, and when taken to church he amused himself by factorising the numbers of the hymns.

After schooling at Cranleigh, Hardy was awarded a scholarship to Winchester College for his mathematical work. In 1896, he entered Trinity College, Cambridge. After only two years of preparation under his coach, Robert Alfred Herman, Hardy was fourth in the Mathematics Tripos examination. Years later, he sought to abolish the Tripos system, as he felt that it was becoming more an end in itself than a means to an end. While at university, Hardy joined the Cambridge Apostles, an elite, intellectual secret society.

Hardy cited as his most important influence his independent study of Cours d'analyse de l'École Polytechnique by the French mathematician Camille Jordan, through which he became acquainted with the more precise mathematics tradition in continental Europe. In 1900 he passed part II of the Tripos, and in the same year he was elected to a Prize Fellowship at Trinity College. In 1903 he earned his M.A., which was the highest academic degree at English universities at that time. When his Prize Fellowship expired in 1906 he was appointed to the Trinity staff as a lecturer in mathematics, where teaching six hours per week left him time for research. In 1919 he left Cambridge to take the Savilian Chair of Geometry (and thus become a Fellow of New College) at Oxford in the aftermath of the Bertrand Russell affair during World War I. Hardy spent the academic year 1928–1929 at Princeton in an academic exchange with Oswald Veblen, who spent the year at Oxford. Hardy gave the Josiah Willards Gibbs lecture for 1928. Hardy left Oxford and returned to Cambridge in 1931, becoming again a fellow of Trinity College and holding the Sadleirian Professorship until 1942.

He was on the governing body of Abingdon School from 1922 to 1935.

Work
Hardy is credited with reforming British mathematics by bringing rigour into it, which was previously a characteristic of French, Swiss and German mathematics. British mathematicians had remained largely in the tradition of applied mathematics, in thrall to the reputation of Isaac Newton (see Cambridge Mathematical Tripos). Hardy was more in tune with the cours d'analyse methods dominant in France, and aggressively promoted his conception of pure mathematics, in particular against the hydrodynamics that was an important part of Cambridge mathematics.

From 1911, he collaborated with John Edensor Littlewood, in extensive work in mathematical analysis and analytic number theory. This (along with much else) led to quantitative progress on Waring's problem, as part of the Hardy–Littlewood circle method, as it became known. In prime number theory, they proved results and some notable conditional results. This was a major factor in the development of number theory as a system of conjectures; examples are the first and second Hardy–Littlewood conjectures. Hardy's collaboration with Littlewood is among the most successful and famous collaborations in mathematical history. In a 1947 lecture, the Danish mathematician Harald Bohr reported a colleague as saying, "Nowadays, there are only three really great English mathematicians: Hardy, Littlewood, and Hardy–Littlewood."

Hardy is also known for formulating the Hardy–Weinberg principle, a basic principle of population genetics, independently from Wilhelm Weinberg in 1908. He played cricket with the geneticist Reginald Punnett, who introduced the problem to him in purely mathematical terms. Hardy, who had no interest in genetics and described the mathematical argument as "very simple", may never have realised how important the result became.

Hardy's collected papers have been published in seven volumes by Oxford University Press.

Pure mathematics

Hardy preferred his work to be considered pure mathematics, perhaps because of his detestation of war and the military uses to which mathematics had been applied. He made several statements similar to that in his Apology:

However, aside from formulating the Hardy–Weinberg principle in population genetics, his famous work on integer partitions with his collaborator Ramanujan, known as the Hardy–Ramanujan asymptotic formula, has been widely applied in physics to find quantum partition functions of atomic nuclei (first used by Niels Bohr) and to derive thermodynamic functions of non-interacting Bose–Einstein systems. Though Hardy wanted his maths to be "pure" and devoid of any application, much of his work has found applications in other branches of science.

Moreover, Hardy deliberately pointed out in his Apology that mathematicians generally do not "glory in the uselessness of their work," but rather – because science can be used for evil ends as well as good – "mathematicians may be justified in rejoicing that there is one science at any rate, and that their own, whose very remoteness from ordinary human activities should keep it gentle and clean." Hardy also rejected as a "delusion" the belief that the difference between pure and applied mathematics had anything to do with their utility. Hardy regards as "pure" the kinds of mathematics that are independent of the physical world, but also considers some "applied" mathematicians, such as the physicists Maxwell and Einstein, to be among the "real" mathematicians, whose work "has permanent aesthetic value" and "is eternal because the best of it may, like the best literature, continue to cause intense emotional satisfaction to thousands of people after thousands of years." Although he admitted that what he called "real" mathematics may someday become useful, he asserted that, at the time in which the Apology was written, only the "dull and elementary parts" of either pure or applied mathematics could "work for good or ill."

Attitudes and personality

Socially, Hardy was associated with the Bloomsbury group and the Cambridge Apostles; G. E. Moore, Bertrand Russell and J. M. Keynes were friends. He was an avid cricket fan. Maynard Keynes observed that if Hardy had read the stock exchange for half an hour every day with as much interest and attention as he did the day's cricket scores, he would have become a rich man.

He was at times politically involved, if not an activist. He took part in the Union of Democratic Control during World War I, and For Intellectual Liberty in the late 1930s.

Apart from close friendships, he had a few platonic relationships with young men who shared his sensibilities, and often his love of cricket. A mutual interest in cricket led him to befriend the young C. P. Snow. Hardy was a lifelong bachelor and in his final years he was cared for by his sister.

Hardy was extremely shy as a child, and was socially awkward, cold and eccentric throughout his life. During his school years he was top of his class in most subjects, and won many prizes and awards but hated having to receive them in front of the entire school. He was uncomfortable being introduced to new people, and could not bear to look at his own reflection in a mirror. It is said that, when staying in hotels, he would cover all the mirrors with towels.

Paul Hoffman writes that "His concerns were wide-ranging, as evidenced by six New Year's resolutions he set in a postcard to a friend: "(1) prove the Riemann hypothesis; (2) make 211 no out in the fourth innings of the last Test Match at the Oval; (3) find an argument for the nonexistence of God which shall convince the general public; (4) be the first man at the top of Mount Everest; (5) be proclaimed the first president of the U. S. S. R. of Great Britain and Germany; and (6) murder Mussolini." .

Hardy's aphorisms
 It is never worth a first-class man's time to express a majority opinion. By definition, there are plenty of others to do that.
 A mathematician, like a painter or a poet, is a maker of patterns. If his patterns are more permanent than theirs, it is because they are made with ideas.
 We have concluded that the trivial mathematics is, on the whole, useful, and that the real mathematics, on the whole, is not.
 Galois died at twenty-one, Abel at twenty-seven, Ramanujan at thirty-three, Riemann at forty. There have been men who have done great work a good deal later; Gauss's great memoir on differential geometry was published when he was fifty (though he had had the fundamental ideas ten years before). I do not know an instance of a major mathematical advance initiated by a man past fifty.
 Hardy once told Bertrand Russell "If I could prove by logic that you would die in five minutes, I should be sorry you were going to die, but my sorrow would be very much mitigated by pleasure in the proof".
 A chess problem is genuine mathematics, but it is in some way 'trivial' mathematics. However ingenious and intricate, however original and surprising the moves, there is something essential lacking. Chess problems are unimportant. The best mathematics is serious as well as beautiful - 'important.'

Cultural references
Hardy is a key character, played by Jeremy Irons, in the 2015 film The Man Who Knew Infinity, based on the biography of Ramanujan with the same title. Hardy is a major character in David Leavitt's historical fiction novel The Indian Clerk (2007), which depicts his Cambridge years and his relationship with John Edensor Littlewood and Ramanujan. Hardy is a secondary character in Uncle Petros and Goldbach's Conjecture (1992), a mathematics novel by Apostolos Doxiadis. Hardy is also a character in the 2014 Indian film, Ramanujan, played by Kevin McGowan.

Bibliography
  Full text The reprinted Mathematician's Apology with an introduction by C.P. Snow was recommended by Marcus du Sautoy in the BBC Radio program A Good Read in 2007.
 
 
 
  Full text
  Vol.1 Vol.3 Vol.6 Vol.7

See also

 Critical line theorem
 Campbell–Hardy theorem
 Hardy hierarchy
 Hardy notation
 Hardy space
 Hardy–Hille formula
 Hardy–Littlewood definition
 Hardy–Littlewood inequality
 Hardy–Littlewood maximal function
 Hardy–Littlewood tauberian theorem
 Hardy–Littlewood zeta-function conjectures
 Hardy–Ramanujan Journal
 Hardy–Ramanujan number
 Hardy–Ramanujan theorem
 Hardy's inequality
 Hardy's theorem
 Hardy field
 Hardy Z function
 Pisot–Vijayaraghavan number
 Ulam spiral

Notes

References

Further reading

 Reprinted as

External links

 
 
 
 
Quotations of G. H. Hardy
Hardy's work on Number Theory

1877 births
1947 deaths
Mathematical analysts
Number theorists
Population geneticists
19th-century English mathematicians
20th-century English mathematicians
Savilian Professors of Geometry
Fellows of the Royal Society
Members of the French Academy of Sciences
Foreign associates of the National Academy of Sciences
Fellows of Trinity College, Cambridge
Alumni of Trinity College, Cambridge
Cambridge University Moral Sciences Club
English atheists
People educated at Cranleigh School
People educated at Winchester College
Royal Medal winners
Recipients of the Copley Medal
People from Cranleigh
Fellows of New College, Oxford
De Morgan Medallists
Mathematics writers
Governors of Abingdon School
British textbook writers
Sadleirian Professors of Pure Mathematics